The Canton of Nouvion  is a former canton situated in the department of the Somme and in the former Picardy region of northern France. It was disbanded following the French canton reorganisation which came into effect in March 2015. It consisted of 17 communes, which joined the canton of Abbeville-1 in 2015. It had 8,301 inhabitants (2012).

Geography 
The canton is organised around the commune of Nouvion in the arrondissement of Abbeville. The altitude varies from 0m at Noyelles-sur-Mer to 102m at Gapennes for an average of 35m.

The canton comprised 17 communes:

Agenvillers
Buigny-Saint-Maclou
Canchy
Domvast
Forest-l'Abbaye
Forest-Montiers
Gapennes
Hautvillers-Ouville
Lamotte-Buleux
Millencourt-en-Ponthieu
Neuilly-l'Hôpital
Nouvion
Noyelles-sur-Mer
Ponthoile
Port-le-Grand
Sailly-Flibeaucourt
Le Titre

Population

See also
 Arrondissements of the Somme department
 Cantons of the Somme department
 Communes of the Somme department

References

Nouvion
2015 disestablishments in France
States and territories disestablished in 2015